"Frijolero" is a song from Molotov's 2003 record Dance and Dense Denso. Its lyrics comprise an exchange where characters trade racially loaded barbs at the Mexico–US border. "Frijolero" is a facetious calque of "beaner", an insulting American English term for a Mexican; the American character is described as "pinche gringo puñetero" (roughly, "fucking gringo wanker").

The group won a Latin Grammy for the colorful rotoscoped video in the field of Best Short Form Music Video.

The song is featured in the soundtrack of Omar Rodriguez-Lopez's movie Los Chidos, released in 2012.

References

2003 songs
2003 singles
Latin Grammy Award for Best Short Form Music Video
Molotov (band) songs
Universal Music Latino singles
Songs against racism and xenophobia
Cultural depictions of George W. Bush